Benjamin Satterley (born 22 August 1986) better known by his ring name Pac, is an English professional wrestler. He is currently signed to All Elite Wrestling (AEW). He is a former and the first ever AEW All-Atlantic Champion (now called the AEW International Championship) and AEW World Trios Champions with his Death Triangle stablemates The Lucha Brothers (Penta El Zero M and Rey Fénix). He is also known for his six-year tenure in WWE from 2012 to 2018, where he competed under the ring name Adrian Neville (and later simply Neville).

Satterley is noted for his high-flying style and aerial attacks, which has earned him the nickname "The Man That Gravity Forgot". He began his wrestling career under the ring name Pac in North East England with a small promotion, the Independent Wrestling Federation (IWF), and after establishing himself in the United Kingdom with promotions such as Real Quality Wrestling and One Pro Wrestling, he began to perform overseas, most notably for the United States-based Pro Wrestling Guerrilla (PWG), Ring of Honor (ROH), and Chikara, as well as the Japan-based Dragon Gate, where he won the Open the Brave, Triangle, and Twin Gate Championship. He is a former PWG World Tag Team Champion and winner of PWG's inaugural Dynamite Duumvirate Tag Team Title Tournament.

From 2012 to 2015, Satterley wrestled in NXT, WWE's developmental territory, as Adrian Neville. He won the NXT Tag Team Championship twice, with his first reign being as one half of the inaugural champions with Oliver Grey and the other reign with Corey Graves. He is also a one-time NXT Champion, making him the first man to have held both the NXT Championship and the NXT Tag Team Championship. Neville was promoted to the main roster in early 2015. He began competing in the cruiserweight division in December 2016, and became a record two-time and longest-reigning WWE Cruiserweight Champion.

After leaving WWE in 2018, Satterley reverted to his previous ring name of Pac and returned to Dragon Gate, where he was the Open the Dream Gate Champion for much of his time there and a former member of the villainous R.E.D. stable. In 2019, he left Dragon Gate and signed with AEW, where he became one-third of the Death Triangle stable alongside the Lucha Brothers (Penta El Zero Miedo and Rey Fenix); after Pac became the inaugural AEW All-Atlantic Champion in 2022, he and his stablemates would win the AEW World Trios Championship, also making him the first double champion in AEW history.

Early life
Benjamin Satterley was born in Newcastle upon Tyne on 22 August 1986, the son of Stephen and Gill (sometimes spelled Jill) Satterley. He was extremely active as a child and participated in sports such as football, hockey, roller hockey, basketball, and swimming. His interest in wrestling came about through one of his aunts, who was a fan of the World Wrestling Federation. His parents had banned him from watching wrestling at their house, so he would go to his aunt's house to watch it. His favorite wrestlers growing up were The Undertaker and "Hacksaw" Jim Duggan. By the age of 16, Satterley had wrestled with backyard wrestling organizations TWXW in Gateshead and FXW in nearby Middlesbrough. Satterley also visited Scarborough Wrestling Alliance in Scarborough and Essex Championship Wrestling in Essex. Even as one of the younger wrestlers in the group, Satterley's technical ability and athleticism ensured he was always in the most entertaining matches. Many of the FXW roster went on to form 3Count Wrestling (3CW), an organization Satterley would later return to. He started training as a wrestler on a more permanent basis at the age of 18 at St Joseph's Hall in Gateshead, described by Satterley as "pretty much the only wrestling school in the area".

Professional wrestling career

European competition (2004–2012)
Satterley made his debut at Independent Wrestling Federation on 27 March 2004, under the ring name Pac, losing to Assassin. For the first two years of his career, he wrestled mainly for IWF and 3 Count Wrestling. He won his first championship on 26 August 2005 when he teamed up with Harry Pain to defeat Chris Prime. In 2006 he began to wrestle all across Britain and Europe.

Satterley later performed in British promotion 3 Count Wrestling. He debuted on 14 October 2005 and defeated EdEn and Falcon in the opening match. Pac then went on to capture the 3CW North East Championship on 24 February 2006. He then captured the 3CW Triple Crown Championship at an ICW event, which he held for 110 days. Pac was defeated in his last 3CW match by Liam Thomson on 30 April 2010.

Pac made his debut for International Pro Wrestling: United Kingdom in April 2006, wrestling for the IPW:UK Title on his debut, coming up short in a triple threat against Leroy Kincaide and champion and match winner Martin Stone. He later had two more shots at the top title in IPW:UK against Stone and then against Andy Boy Simmonz but came up short.  After a September 2006 triple threat against Kevin Steen and El Generico, the two Canadian wrestlers recommended Satterley to PWG head-booker Super Dragon and as covered below, he made his PWG debut two months later as a result of this match.

After joining One Pro Wrestling in May 2006, Pac became the first-ever Openweight Champion on 26 November after winning a battle royal. He successfully retained the title on several occasions before losing it to James Wallace on 30 June 2007 in a match that started immediately after Pac retained the title in a four-way match. On 29 December, Pac failed to reclaim the title after losing to then-champion Darren Burridge.

In late April, Pac represented International Pro Wrestling: United Kingdom in the prestigious King of Europe Cup. He defeated Trent Acid in the first round before falling to Nigel McGuinness in the quarter finals.

In 2007, Satterley began wrestling in the Italy-based Nu-Wrestling Evolution under the ring name Jungle Pac. As Jungle Pac, Satterley's character was that of a jungle native, which is emphasised by his attire consisting of a loincloth or a lava-lava over his trunks as well as being billed from "The Jungle". On 19 April 2008, Jungle Pac competed in a four-way ladder match for the vacant Cruiserweight Championship against Juventud Guerrera, Matt Cross and Super Nova, which was won by Guerrera. On 26 October, Jungle Pac wrestled against Guerrera and Super Nova in a three-way match for the Cruiserweight Title, but was unable to win the title. He wrestled against Guerrera and Nova in two more three-way matches for the title on 1 and 2 November, but was again unable to win the title. PAC wrestled in Premier British Wrestling (PBW) on two occasions before signing with WWE.

On 17 November 2009, Pac debuted in American Wrestling Rampage during its European Invasion tour, and lost to Dunkan Disorderly in a three-way match also involving Shawn Maxer for the promotion's No Limits Championship. Two days later, he wrestled against Disorderly in a singles match for the title, but was defeated. After defeating Disorderly in tag-team matches over the next two days, Pac and Maxer wrestled against Disorderly for the No Limits Title in another three-way match on 22 November, but were again defeated. After trading wins with El Generico over the next few days, Pac finally won the title after defeating Generico and new champion Michael Knight on 29 November. After successfully retaining the title against Generico on 4 and 6 December, Pac lost the title to Dunkan Disorderly on 8 December. The next day, Pac and Generico defeated Disorderly and Shawn Maxer in a tag-team match.

Pro Wrestling Guerrilla (2006–2008)
On 17 November 2006, Pac made his debut in Pro Wrestling Guerrilla. He competed against A.J. Styles in a losing effort of the first night of All Star Weekend IV. The next night, he faced El Generico in a match that was considered by those in attendance a serious Match of the Year contender. Pac returned to PWG on 24 February 2007, defeating Kevin Steen to pick up his first win in the promotion. He faced Generico again on 7 April, this time in the main event of the first night of All Star Weekend V with the PWG World Championship on the line.  Generico once again came out on top. The next night, Pac faced All Japan Pro Wrestling star Kaz Hayashi in a losing effort.

Pac was originally scheduled to compete in singles matches during the first PWG Dynamite Duumvirate Tag Team Title Tournament on 20 and 21 May. However, Roderick Strong's original partner, Jack Evans, had been called back to Dragon Gate at the last moment and decided to have Pac fill the vacant spot. After defeating Super Dragon and Davey Richards in the first round, Naruki Doi and Masato Yoshino in the second round and then The Briscoe Brothers in the finals, Pac and Strong won the tournament and as a result, became the new World Tag Team Champions. In their first title defence, Pac and Strong defeated The Havana Pitbulls (Ricky Reyes and Rocky Romero) at PWG's event Roger Dorn Night on 10 June. From 15 to 22 July, Pac took part and competed for Dragon Gate's biggest tour of the year, Wrestle Jam, where he and El Generico represented PWG alongside Ring of Honor representatives Austin Aries, Delirious, Jack Evans, Matt Sydal and Jimmy Rave.

On 29 July, Pac and Strong were scheduled to defend their World Tag Team Championship against the Briscoe Brothers in a 2 out of 3 falls match. However, they were replaced by Kevin Steen and El Generico, who ended up winning World Tag Team Championship in a one fall match. Pac was among the 24 participants in the 2007 Battle of Los Angeles Tournament in Burbank, California that ran from 31 August to 2 September. He defeated Jack Evans in a first round match then Claudio Castagnoli in a second round match before losing to eventual tournament winner Cima in a semi-final round match. After almost a year-long absence from the company, Pac made his return to PWG at All Star Weekend VII on 30 August 2008, where he picked up the win for the team of himself and The Young Bucks by pinning Kevin Steen, who teamed with El Generico and Susumu Yokosuka. The next night, Pac was unsuccessful in his attempt to win the World Championship from then-champion Chris Hero. Pac returned to PWG on 23 July 2011, facing Kevin Steen in a losing effort. On 29 January 2012, at Kurt Russellreunion 3, Pac teamed with El Generico and Masato Yoshino to defeat Akira Tozawa, Kevin Steen and Super Dragon in a six-man tag team main event.

Independent circuit (2007–2012)
In January 2007, Pac wrestled as part of Total Nonstop Action Wrestling's Impact! Total tour in Portugal along with fellow British wrestlers Spud, Jonny Storm and Jody Fleisch. Soon after the tour, Pac debuted in Ring of Honor at their 3 and 4 March shows at the Liverpool Olympia in Liverpool, England. On the first night, he lost to Roderick Strong in a match for the FIP World Heavyweight Championship. On the second, he was defeated by Matt Sydal. On 24 August, he returned to ROH in a losing effort against Bryan Danielson. At ROH's Manhattan Mayhem, he lost to Davey Richards. On 21 April, Pac debuted in Chikara at their show Rey De Voladores in a four-way elimination match against Chuck Taylor, Ricochet and Retail Dragon, which was won by Taylor. In August, Pac returned to Chikara at their International Invaders weekend. On the first night, he was defeated by Ricochet. The next night, he was defeated by Claudio Castagnoli. On 23 August, he participated at the eighth Ballpark Brawl, where he lost a six-way elimination match that featured Sterling James Keenan, Trent Acid, El Generico, Xtremo and John McChesney, which was won by Keenan. On 27 May 2012, Pac made his New Japan Pro-Wrestling debut, when he entered the 2012 Best of the Super Juniors tournament, defeating Jushin Thunder Liger in his first match. When the round-robin stage of the tournament concluded on 9 June, PAC finished with five wins out of his eight matches, winning his block and advancing to the semifinals of the tournament. He lost to Ryusuke Taguchi the following day, and was eliminated from the tournament.

Dragon Gate and affiliates (2007–2012)

Shortly after participating in Pro Wrestling Guerrilla's Battle of Los Angeles tournament, Pac was invited to Dragon Gate for their Dragon Storm 2007 tour beginning on 8 September. The tour was the last for World Wrestling Entertainment-bound Matt Sydal, who on 14 September endorsed PAC to be his replacement on the Dragon Gate faction Typhoon. On 15 September, Pac defeated Dragon Kid for the Westside Xtreme Wrestling World Lightweight Championship. On 25 April 2008, Pac lost to Gamma in the first round of a tournament for the Open the Brave Gate Championship. On 31 May, Pac and Dragon Kid wrestled against fellow Typhoon members Ryo Saito and Susumu Yokosuka for the Open the Twin Gate Championship, but were unable to win. On 27 July, Pac, Dragon Kid and Anthony W. Mori represented Typhoon in a four-way match for the Open the Triangle Gate Championship, but were unable to defeat Gamma, Yamato and Yasushi Kanda for the title.

After Typhoon disbanded in 2008, Pac joined World-1 in 2009. On 22 March 2009, Pac, BxB Hulk and Naoki Tanisaki represented World-1 in a losing effort to the Open the Triangle Gate Champions Kamikaze (Dragon Kid, Shingo Takagi and Taku Iwasa) in a three-way match also involving Real Hazard (Kenichiro Arai, Yamato and Yasushi Kanda). World-1 again challenged for the title on 24 May, but were defeated by the new champions Warriors-5 (Cima, Gamma and Kagetora). On 7 June, World-1 finally won the Open the Triangle Gate Championship after defeating Warriors-5. World-1 made their first successful title defence on 19 July, where they defeated Kamikaze (Akira Tozawa, Dragon Kid and Taku Iwasa).

On 7 February 2010, Pac lost to K-ness in a match for the Open the Brave Gate Championship. On 5 July 2010, Pac made his debut for Dragon Gate's international expansion Dragon Gate USA, wrestling in a match where he and BxB Hulk were defeated by Yamato and Shingo. At the following day's tapings of the Uprising pay-per-view, PAC and Naruki Doi defeated Jigsaw and Mike Quackenbush. On 14 October, World-1 lost the Open the Triangle Gate Title to Akebono, Fujii and Mochizuki in a rematch. On 20 December 2010, Dragon Gate USA announced that they had signed Pac to a contract that would make him a regular member of the promotion's roster. On 30 January 2011, PAC and Masato Yoshino defeated Chuck Taylor and Johnny Gargano to become Dragon Gate USA's first ever Open the United Gate Champions. On 11 September, Pac and Yoshino lost the Open the United Gate Championship to Open the Twin Gate Champions, Cima and Ricochet, in a title vs. title match. On 29 August 2010, Pac defeated Susumu Yokosuka in a tournament final to win the vacant Open the Brave Gate Championship for the first time. On 14 April 2011, Pac, BxB Hulk and Susumu Yokosuka failed to win the Open the Triangle Gate Championship from Blood Warriors (Cima, Dragon Kid and Ricochet) and, as a result, World-1 was forced to disband. On 24 April former World-1 members Pac, Hulk, Yokosuka and Yoshino agreed to form a new alliance with Masaaki Mochizuki to battle Blood Warriors. On 8 June, the new group was named Junction Three in reference to it being a union between the former members of World-1, Kamikaze and the Veteran-gun. On 19 June, Pac and Dragon Kid defeated the Blood Warriors team of Ryo Saito and Genki Horiguchi to win the Open the Twin Gate Championship. They lost the title to Blood Warriors representatives Cima and Ricochet on 17 July. On 19 November, Pac lost the Open the Brave Gate Championship to Ricochet, ending his record reign at 447 days. On 9 February 2012, Junction Three was forced to disband, after losing a fourteen-man elimination tag team match to Blood Warriors. On 4 March, Pac received a shot at Dragon Gate's top title, the Open the Dream Gate Championship, but was defeated by defending champion, Cima. On 25 March 2012, Pac joined Masato Yoshino, Naruki Doi, Ricochet, and Rich Swann and formed World-1 International. On 6 May 2012, Pac, alongside World-1 International members Masato Yoshino and Naruki Doi defeated Genki Horiguchi H.A.Gee.Mee!, Jimmy Kanda, and Ryo "Jimmy" Saito at the 2012 Dead or Alive pay-per-view to become the 34th Open the Triangle Gate Champions. On 22 July, Pac made his final Dragon Gate appearance, during which he, Yoshino and Doi successfully defended the Open the Triangle Gate Championship in a three-way match.

WWE

British Ambition (2012–2013)
In July 2012, it was reported that Satterley had signed a contract with WWE. He joined WWE's developmental territory NXT, and made his television debut using the ring name Adrian Neville on the 16 January 2013 episode of NXT, where he defeated Sakamoto.

Together with Oliver Grey, the English duo won a tournament to crown the inaugural NXT Tag Team Champions by defeating The Wyatt Family (Luke Harper and Erick Rowan) in the finals on the 13 February episode of NXT. Neville and Grey, now billed as British Ambition had earlier defeated 3MB (Heath Slater and Drew McIntyre) in the first round and Kassius Ohno and Leo Kruger in the semi-finals. With Grey out injured with a torn ACL (in storyline inflicted by the Wyatt Family), Neville chose Bo Dallas as his new partner in April. On 24 April on NXT, Neville lost to Antonio Cesaro while challenging for his United States Championship. On the 8 May episode of NXT, Neville and Dallas failed in their first defence of the tag title when they lost them to the Wyatt Family.

NXT Champion (2013–2014)

On the 29 May episode of NXT, Neville competed in an NXT Championship number one contender battle royal, eliminating Mason Ryan and Bray Wyatt (who had eleven and two eliminations respectively) to make it to the final two participants, but his former tag partner Dallas eliminated him to win the match. Later, Dallas won his title match to become NXT Champion. Neville continued his feud with the Wyatt Family by losing to them in two six-man tag matches, once while teaming with Corey Graves and Kassius Ohno, and once with Graves and William Regal. On 20 June, Neville regained the NXT Tag Team Championship from the Wyatt Family with a new partner in Graves. On the 6 August episode of NXT, Neville faced Dean Ambrose for his United States Championship, which Ambrose retained when the other members of The Shield caused a disqualification. Neville and Graves lost the title to The Ascension (Conor O'Brian and Rick Victor) in September. Following this, the two feuded after failing to regain the title.

Neville first became number one contender to the NXT Championship on the 27 November episode of NXT by defeating Sami Zayn, after both men previously tied a beat the clock challenge. Neville faced former tag partner Bo Dallas for the title on the next episode and won by countout, which meant that the title did not change hands. Two episodes later, Neville faced Dallas again for the title in a lumberjack match, but lost when lumberjack Tyler Breeze interfered. Neville once again became number one contender after Dallas failed to defeat Neville in a beat-the-clock challenge match on the 22 January episode of NXT that arose due to Dallas' boasting. At NXT Arrival, Neville won the NXT Championship from Dallas in a ladder match. A rematch was scheduled for the 20 March episode of NXT, which he won after debuting a new finisher, the imploding 450° splash.

Neville's first feud as champion began following a non-title match against Brodus Clay, where Neville won by countout. The feud ended with Neville scoring a No Disqualification match victory over Clay to successfully defend the NXT Championship. At NXT TakeOver, Neville successfully defended the NXT Championship against Tyson Kidd. Two weeks later, Neville retained his championship against Kidd again after Natalya prevented Kidd from using a chair. On the 31 July episode of NXT, he successfully defended his title against Tyler Breeze by disqualification as Tyson Kidd attacked Neville after being super kicked by Neville. On 8 September, Neville made his first appearance on Raw as part of an NXT showcase match to promote NXT TakeOver: Fatal 4-Way, he teamed with Sami Zayn to defeat Kidd and Breeze in a tag team match. On 11 September at the NXT TakeOver: Fatal 4-Way event, Neville successfully defended his NXT Championship against Sami Zayn, Tyler Breeze and Tyson Kidd in a fatal four-way match. On 4 December, Neville became the longest reigning NXT Champion of all time, surpassing the record set by Bo Dallas (which was surpassed by Finn Bálor in April 2016). Later, on 11 December at the NXT TakeOver: R Evolution event, Neville lost the championship to Zayn, ending his reign at 287 days. When Zayn offered a handshake, Neville kicked it away and instead hugged Zayn in respect.

Various feuds (2015–2016)

The following week on the 18 December episode of NXT, Neville faced Kevin Owens, but the match ended in a double countout. Owens powerbombed Neville into the apron after the match. Neville received a rematch on the 15 January 2015 episode of NXT, but failed to regain the title. Neville went on to compete in a NXT Championship number one contender's tournament, defeating Tyson Kidd in the quarterfinals on 28 January and Baron Corbin in the semifinals on 4 February, but lost in the finals to Finn Bálor at NXT TakeOver: Rival.
On the 30 March 2015 episode of Raw, Satterley made his main roster debut, under the shortened ring name Neville, defeating Curtis Axel. He then defeated Bad News Barrett at the Extreme Rules pay-per-view the following month. Following this, Neville competed in the 2015 King of the Ring tournament, where he was defeated by Barrett in the finals. Following this, Neville would begin a feud with Bo Dallas, setting up a match at Elimination Chamber, which Neville won.

Neville would then enter a feud with Stardust in a comic book inspired rivalry. At SummerSlam on 23 August, Neville would team up with actor Stephen Amell, defeating the team of Stardust and Barrett. At Night of Champions in September, Neville would team with The Lucha Dragons (Kalisto and Sin Cara) in a loss to Stardust and the Ascension. At the Survivor Series pre-show, Neville would compete in a traditional Survivor Series match, teaming with The Dudley Boyz (Bubba Ray Dudley and D-Von Dudley), Goldust and Titus O'Neil in a victory over Stardust, The Ascension, The Miz and Bo Dallas. On the 21 December episode of Raw, Neville won the Slammy Award for "Breakout Star of the Year".

At the Royal Rumble on 24 January 2016, Neville competed in his first Royal Rumble match as the number 16 entrant, lasting over 10 minutes before being eliminated by Luke Harper. In March 2016, Neville injured his ankle during a match with Chris Jericho on Raw, rendering him out of action for an estimated two to three months and forcing him to miss WrestleMania 32, at which he was scheduled to compete.

On 19 July, at the 2016 WWE draft, Neville was drafted to Raw. On the 25 July episode of Raw, Neville made his televised return, defeating Curtis Axel. Neville teamed with Sami Zayn to defeat The Dudley Boyz (Bubba Ray Dudley and D-Von Dudley) at SummerSlam. The following night on Raw, Neville failed to defeat Kevin Owens to qualify for a fatal four-way elimination match for the vacant WWE Universal Championship after the interference of Chris Jericho. On the 31 October episode of Raw, Neville participated in a battle royal for a spot on Team Raw at Survivor Series, but was eliminated by eventual winner Braun Strowman.

Cruiserweight Champion (2016–2017)

On 18 December at Roadblock: End of the Line, Neville returned to seemingly congratulate Cruiserweight Champion Rich Swann after his match only to attack Swann and his opponent T. J. Perkins, turning heel and joining the Cruiserweight division. The following night on Raw, Neville cemented his villainous turn after claiming that the fans only cheered him because he was "vulnerable or small" and proceeded to attack Swann along with Brian Kendrick after he interrupted him, followed by Perkins after he attempted to save Swann. Over the coming weeks, Neville would defeat multiple Cruiserweights in singles competition including Perkins, Cedric Alexander, Lince Dorado and Swann in a non-title match. On 29 January 2017 at the Royal Rumble, Neville defeated Swann to capture the Cruiserweight Championship for the first time, marking his first title win on the main roster. Neville then started a feud with Jack Gallagher, and successfully defended his title at Fastlane against Gallagher.

The following night on Raw, Neville defended his title against Swann successfully. After the match, Austin Aries seemingly appeared to interview Neville only to attack him and start a feud between the two. At WrestleMania 33, Neville would defeat Aries in his WrestleMania in-ring debut. Aries won a fatal-four-way match two days later on 205 Live, to earn a rematch against Neville at Payback, which Neville lost by disqualification, retaining the title as a result. Around this time, Neville formed an alliance with T. J. Perkins, who would assist him in his rivalry with Aries, in exchange for a promised championship opportunity. Neville defeated Aries again in a submission match at Extreme Rules to retain the Cruiserweight Championship, concluding their rivalry in the process. He ended his alliance with Perkins the following night, attacking him and later going on to successfully defend his championship against him on the 6 June episode of 205 Live.

Neville then began feuding with Akira Tozawa who was granted a championship match for Great Balls of Fire by Titus O'Neil, in which Neville retained the title. He was also set to defend his title against Tozawa for the second time at SummerSlam, until the 14 August episode of Raw, where Neville lost the championship to Tozawa, ending his record setting reign at 197 days. However, Neville won the title back from Tozawa on the SummerSlam pre-show, making him the first-ever two-time WWE Cruiserweight Champion with the current belt.

Afterwards, he was confronted by Enzo Amore, the latest member of the Cruiserweight division. On 24 September at No Mercy, Neville dropped the title to Amore after being hit with a low blow while the referee was distracted. The following night on Raw, a double turn took place; Amore turned heel by disparaging the cruiserweight division, while Neville turned face when he spoke on behalf of the cruiserweights and attempted to attack Amore. Amore revealed he had a no-contact clause, which prevents any of the cruiserweights of receiving a future title shot should they attack him, but Neville attacked him nonetheless after the cruiserweights prevented Amore from leaving. The next night on 205 Live, after Neville defeated Ariya Daivari, he was attacked by Amore with a crutch. This would be Neville's final appearance on WWE programming.

Contract dispute and departure (2017–2018)
On 9 October, Neville walked out on Raw, on which he was scheduled to lose to Enzo Amore. According to multiple sources Neville appeared to have quit the promotion, with one report stating that he had been unhappy for a while. WWE denied that Neville had left the promotion. By 13 November, there had reportedly been "positive discussions" between Neville and WWE with some in the company believing he could be on his way back. In January 2018, WWE froze Neville's contract, keeping him under contract indefinitely or until a release is agreed upon. On 24 August, it was reported that Neville was no longer under contract.

Return to Dragon Gate (2018–2019)
On 2 October 2018, two months after his WWE contract expired and almost exactly one year after he initially walked out on WWE, Satterley returned to Dragon Gate. Using his former ring name, PAC, he aligned himself with Eita and the villainous R.E.D. stable. In his return match, he pinned Shingo Takagi at Korakuen Hall. On 4 December, he defeated Masato Yoshino to win the Open the Dream Gate Championship at Dragon Gate's "Fantastic Gate 2018" from Korakuen Hall. He held the championship until 21 July 2019, when he would lose it to Ben-K, ending his reign at 229 days.

All Elite Wrestling

Feud with Kenny Omega (2019–2020) 
On 8 January 2019, Pac was announced as one of the first signees to All Elite Wrestling (AEW). At AEW's inaugural rally in Jacksonville, Pac interrupted Adam Page, setting up a feud between the two wrestlers. At AEW's second rally in Las Vegas, a match between Page and Pac was officially announced for the company's inaugural event, Double or Nothing. However, in late May the match was cancelled due to "creative differences". They wrestled a match for independent promotion Wrestle Gate Pro on 17 May a week before Double or Nothing. Page won the match by disqualification and after the match, Pac attacked Page's knee and said that his goal all along was to injure Page and with that done, he had no reason to show up at Double or Nothing, thus establishing himself as a heel in the process. This was done to write the match off the card. On 23 August, Pac was revealed as Jon Moxley's replacement at All Out against Kenny Omega after Moxley was forced to pull out of the event due to injury. At All Out on 31 August, Pac defeated Omega by making him pass out in a crucifix hold (commonly known as the Rings of Saturn or the Brutaliser). On the premiere episode of Dynamite on 2 October, Pac defeated Page, thus rekindling their feud. At Full Gear on 9 November, Pac was defeated by Page, thereby suffering his first singles loss in AEW. Four days later on the 13 November episode of Dynamite, Pac defeated Page to end the feud.

By the end of 2019 and going into 2020, Pac began a prolonged feud with Kenny Omega. After losing to him in a rematch on November 27 episode of Dynamite, Pac began relentlessly pursuing a rubber match. After attacking Omega's friend Michael Nakazawa, Omega agreed to the match on 5 February 2020. The two wrestled in a 30-minute Iron Man match on the 26 February episode of Dynamite, which Pac lost after the match went to sudden death overtime. After the loss, Pac's post-match interview was interrupted by Orange Cassidy, leading to a match between the two being arranged for the Revolution event on 24 February, in which Pac was victorious.

Death Triangle (2020–2022) 

On 4 March episode of Dynamite, Pac formed an alliance with the Lucha Brothers (Pentagon Jr. and Rey Fenix) called The Death Triangle, attacking Orange Cassidy and Best Friends (Chuck Taylor and Trent). Pac would become absent from AEW television soon after as he was unable to travel due to the COVID-19 pandemic. After an eight-month absence from television, Pac returned to AEW on the 11 November episode of Dynamite where he confronted Eddie Kingston, thus turning face for the first time since 2016. On the following episode of Dynamite, Death Triangle was reformed after Fénix and Pentagón Jr. saved Pac from an attack by Kingston, The Butcher and The Blade.

At New Year's Smash on 13 January 2021, Pac defeated Kingston. At Revolution on 7 March, Pac and Fénix won a Casino Tag Team Battle Royale to determine the next challengers for the AEW World Tag Team Championship. They challenged The Young Bucks (Matt Jackson and Nick Jackson) for the tag team championship on the 14 April episode of Dynamite, but were defeated. This match was awarded a five star rating from Dave Meltzer. Ranked as the #2 contender for the AEW World Championship, Pac and Orange Cassidy faced off in a rematch to decide the #1 contender for Kenny Omega at Double or Nothing. The match ended in a double count-out, due to interference from Omega and Don Callis. However, Tony Khan signed a three-way match for Double or Nothing, in which Omega retained his championship.

After Double or Nothing, Pac started a feud with Andrade El Idolo, which led to a match on the September 9 episode of Rampage, where Pac was defeated. Pac and Andrade had a rematch on the October 22 episode of Rampage, where Pac emerged victorious. At Full Gear, Pac teamed with Cody Rhodes against Andrade and Malakai Black in a winning effort.  On the February 23 edition of Dynamite, Pac again teamed with Penta El Zero Miedo, who was now using the name 'Penta Oscuro', to defeat Kings Of The Black Throne (Brody King and Malakai Black). At Revolution's buy-in show, Pac and Oscuro would team with Erick Redbeard in a trios match against the House of Black (now completed with Buddy Matthews), which they lost.

Double champion (2022–present) 
In June, Pac would participate in a tournament for the AEW All-Atlantic Championship, defeating Buddy Matthews on the June 8 edition of Dynamite, advancing to the finals. On June 26 at Forbidden Door, Pac would defeat Miro, Malakai Black and Clark Connors in a fatal four-way match to become the inaugural champion.

On the August 24 edition of Dynamite, Death Triangle would compete in the AEW World Trios Championship tournament, where they were defeated by United Empire (Will Ospreay, Mark Davis and Kyle Fletcher) in the first round. Death Triangle would win the then-vacated AEW World Trios Championship on September 7 episode of Dynamite, making Pac AEW's first-ever double champion. He would lose his All-Atlantic Championship to Orange Cassidy on October 12 episode of Dynamite, ending his reign at 108 days.

Professional wrestling style and persona

Pac utilizes a corkscrew shooting star press, previously known as the "Red Arrow", as a finishing maneuver. It is now known as the "Black Arrow". After turning into a villain in December 2016, he started using a double underhook crossface submission maneuver called the "Rings of Saturn" as a finisher in tribute to Perry Saturn. After leaving WWE, he changed the move's name to "The Brutalizer". During his independent career and the first part of his WWE run, he was known as "The Man That Gravity Forgot" due to his high-flying style and aerial attacks. After his villainous turn and move to 205 Live, he became known as the "King of the Cruiserweights" and adopted the gimmick of a deluded man who referred to himself as a king and viewed the Cruiserweight Championship as his crown. Mark Henry assisted him in creating his villainous character, including methods of agitating the crowd such as climbing up to the top rope to tease his "Red Arrow" move, only to jump down without performing the move and lock in a submission. Upon leaving WWE, Pac would tweak his villainous character by dropping the "king" aspect and presenting himself as a self-proclaimed "bastard" with no morals or empathy.

Personal life
Satterley is a supporter of his hometown football club Newcastle United. His favorite band is The Specials, and his WWE ring name was a reference to one of their former band members, Neville Staple. He is close friends with fellow professional wrestlers Sami Zayn, Kevin Owens, Bryan Danielson, Zack Sabre Jr, Kenta, and Shingo Takagi. He is married living a private lifestyle.

Other media
Satterley made his video game debut as a playable character in WWE 2K15 as Adrian Neville, in which he has his own path in the "Who Got NXT" mode for the PlayStation 3 and Xbox 360 versions of the game, documenting his matches in NXT. He is also a playable character in WWE 2K15 for the PlayStation 4 and Xbox One. He appeared as Neville in WWE 2K16, WWE 2K17, and WWE 2K18.

Championships and accomplishments

All Elite Wrestling
AEW International Championship (1 time, inaugural)
AEW World Trios Championship (1 time) – with Penta El Zero M and Rey Fénix
AEW All-Atlantic Championship Tournament (2022)
 Men's Casino Tag Team Royale (2021) – with Rey Fénix
 3 Count Wrestling
 3CW Heavyweight Championship  (1 time)
3CW Young Lions Championship (1 time)
 American Wrestling Rampage
 AWR No Limits Championship (1 time)
 Dragon Gate
 Open the Dream Gate Championship (1 time)
 Open the Brave Gate Championship (1 time)
 Open the Twin Gate Championship (1 time) – with Dragon Kid
 Open the Triangle Gate Championship (3 times) – with Masato Yoshino and BxB Hulk (1), Naoki Tanizaki and Naruki Doi (1), and Masato Yoshino and Naruki Doi (1)
Open The Brave Gate Title Tournament (2010)
 Dragon Gate USA
 Open the United Gate Championship (1 time) – with Masato Yoshino
Open The United Gate Title Tournament (2010)
 Frontier Wrestling Alliance
 FWA Flyweight Championship (1 time)
 Independent Wrestling Federation
 IWF Tag Team Championship (1 time) – with Harry Pain
 One Pro Wrestling
 1PW Openweight Championship (1 time)
 Pro Wrestling Guerrilla
 PWG World Tag Team Championship (1 time) – with Roderick Strong
 Dynamite Duumvirate Tag Team Title Tournament (2007) – with Roderick Strong
 Pro Wrestling Illustrated
 Ranked No. 11 of the top 500 singles wrestlers in the PWI 500 in 2017
 Ranked No. 4 of the top 50 tag teams in the PWI Tag Team 50 in 2022 
 Rolling Stone
 Most Exciting NXT Up-and-Comer (2014)
 Most Jaw-Dropping Finisher (2015) 
 One-Night-Only Face Turn of the Year (2017)
 Worst Entrance Gimmick on Great New Main-Roster Wrestler (2015)
 SoCal Uncensored
 Match of the Year (2006) 
 Westside Xtreme Wrestling
 wXw World Lightweight Championship (2 times)
 WWE
 WWE Cruiserweight Championship (2 times)
 NXT Championship (1 time)
 NXT Tag Team Championship  (2 times, inaugural) – with Oliver Grey (1) and Corey Graves (1)
 NXT Tag Team Championship Tournament (2013) – with Oliver Grey
 Slammy Award for Breakout Star of the Year (2015)
Wrestle Zone Wrestling
wZw Zero-G Championship (1 time)

References

External links

 
 
 
 

1986 births
21st-century professional wrestlers
All Elite Wrestling personnel
English male professional wrestlers
Expatriate professional wrestlers in Japan
Living people
NXT Champions
NXT Tag Team Champions
Sportspeople from Newcastle upon Tyne
Expatriate professional wrestlers
NXT/WWE Cruiserweight Champions
AEW All-Atlantic Champions
English expatriate sportspeople in the United States
English expatriate sportspeople in Japan
PWG World Tag Team Champions
AEW World Trios Champions
Open the Dream Gate Champions
Open the Brave Gate Champions
Open the Twin Gate Champions
Open the Triangle Gate Champions